Andriy Mykhailovych Sapuha (born 4 October 1976) is a Ukrainian professional football coach and a former player. He is an assistant coach with Karpaty Lviv.

Career
He made his professional debut in the Ukrainian Premier League in 1992 for FC Karpaty Lviv.

Personal life
He has a son Marko, born in 2003, who also is a professional football player.

Honours
 Ukrainian Premier League bronze: 1998.
 Russian Premier League bronze: 2000.

References

External links
 

1976 births
Living people
Ukrainian footballers
Association football midfielders
Ukrainian expatriate footballers
Expatriate footballers in Russia
Ukrainian expatriate sportspeople in Russia
Expatriate soccer players in the United States
Ukrainian expatriate sportspeople in the United States
Expatriate footballers in Kazakhstan
Ukrainian expatriate sportspeople in Kazakhstan
Russian Premier League players
Ukrainian Premier League players
Ukrainian First League players
Ukrainian Second League players
Kazakhstan Premier League players
Philadelphia Ukrainian Nationals players
FC Karpaty Lviv players
FC Karpaty-2 Lviv players
FC Skala Stryi (1911) players
Philadelphia Ukrainians players
FC Torpedo Moscow players
FC Torpedo-2 players
FC Lokomotiv Nizhny Novgorod players
FC Hoverla Uzhhorod players
FC Fakel Voronezh players
FC Lviv players
FC Atyrau players
Ukrainian football managers
FC Novokuznetsk players
Sportspeople from Lviv Oblast